Close Harmony is a box set of The Louvin Brothers recordings. It is an eight-CD box set and was released in 1992.

History
Close Harmony contains 219 songs from the duo's years with Capitol, Decca, MGM, and Apollo, presented in chronological order along with session notes.

The recordings include such artists as Chet Atkins, Grandpa Jones, The Jordanaires, Jerry Byrd, Pete Drake, Floyd Cramer, Hank Garland and many others.

The annotations for the songs that accompanied the box set were expanded into a book titled In Close Harmony: The Story of the Louvin Brothers by Charles K. Wolfe.

Reception

In his Allmusic review, Thom Jurek describes the release, concluding " Charlie and Ira took harmony singing to a new level and the creation of full-length albums far out of the sphere of one or two singles and filler. It's true that this is mainly for the fanatics, but it's also for libraries and historians of the music... This set is a treasure. Period."

Personnel
Charlie Louvin – vocals, guitar
Ira Louvin – vocals, tenor guitar, mandolin 
Chet Atkins – guitar  
Grandpa Jones – banjo
The Jordanaires – vocals
Harold Bradley – guitar, bass
Owen Bradley – vibraphone
Paul Buskirk – mandolin
Jerry Byrd – pedal steel guitar 
Lightning Chance – bass
Roy Madison "Junior" Huskey – bass
Floyd Cramer – piano
Faye Cunningham – vocals
Pete Drake – pedal steel guitar
Ray Edenton – guitar, banjo
Hank Garland – guitar
Smiley Wilson – guitar
Buddy Harman – drums
William Paul Ackerman – drums
Don Helms – pedal steel guitar
Eddie Hill – fiddle, guitar
Jimmy Capps – guitar
Paul Yandell – guitar
Odell Martin – guitar
George McCormick – guitar, baritone guitar, vocal harmony
Marvin H. Hughes – piano, organ
Shot Jackson – dobro
Thomas Lee Jackson Jr. – fiddle
Dale Potter – fiddle
Jimmy Riddle – harmonica
Production notes:
Paul Cohen – producer
Ken Nelson – producer
Fred Rose – producer
Bob Jones – mastering
Eddie Stubbs – discography
Larry Walsh – mixing
Richard Weize – reissue producer, research
Mark Wilder – disc dub
Hoffmann Nienburg – artwork
Charles K. Wolfe – liner notes, photography, illustrations, discography
Brad Benedict – photography, illustrations 
Manfred Bersebach – photography, illustrations
David Freeman – photography, illustrations

See also
Close harmony

References

The Louvin Brothers albums
1992 compilation albums
Bear Family Records compilation albums